Rolf Dobelli (July 15, 1966) born in Luzern, Switzerland, is a Swiss author and entrepreneur.

Life
Dobelli studied philosophy and business administration at the University of St. Gallen where he graduated with a doctorate on the "Deconstruction of Economic Discourse" in 1995. He then went to work as the CFO and Managing Director in various Swissair subsidiaries. In 1999 he co-founded "getAbstract".

From 2001 to 2009 Dobelli hosted a weekly television show "Seitenweise Wirtschaft" for the Swiss newspaper and media company, NZZ. He also wrote a weekly column on the Art of Thinking Clearly.

Dobelli founded WORLD.MINDS in 2008 to create a bridge between the science, business and cultural communities. Speakers included: Nassim Taleb, Gerhard Schröder, F. W. de Klerk, and Matt Ridley.

He resigned from getAbstract in 2011 so that he could dedicate himself to writing. Dobelli's increasing dissatisfaction with the world of pure business was already reflected in his 2003 novel titled "35 - A Midlife Story". This was followed by his 2004 book, "And what do you do for a living" and his 2007 book "Who am I? 777 indiscreet questions."

"Avoid news consumption" 
Dobelli advises his readers to "avoid news consumption". He cites "fifteen reasons to avoid news"  in a 2013 blog post. It is the subject of a book in English titled, "Stop Reading the News: How to cope with the information overload and think more clearly". Dobelli's writings are sometimes controversial. The Guardian newspaper columnist Madeleine Bunting has even gone so far as accusing his ideas on news of being "dangerous". In 2020, Dobelli stated on China Television that news is "A Disease for the Brain", stating further, "10 years ago I decided to go completely without news – no newspapers, no online news, no television, no radio – and it's been a very rewarding journey for me. I've saved a lot of time. I have more concentration…and have less anxiety." In 2020, in a conversation with Rob Wijnberg Dobelli said, "news focuses mainly on exceptional events. It doesn't help you to fundamentally to understand the world. And it makes you cynical and anxious".

Books and reception
In 2003, Diogenes Verlag (Switzerland) published his first novel, Fünfunddreissig ("Thirty-five"), followed by  Und was machen Sie beruflich? ("And What Do You Do for a Living?") in 2004, Himmelreich (The Heavens) in 2006, Wer bin ich? ("Who am I?") and Turbulenzen ("Turbulence") in 2007 and Massimo Marini in 2010. 
The major themes in Dobelli's novels are the meaning of success and the role of randomness in business and in life.

Dobelli is the author of The Art of Thinking Clearly (Die Kunst des klaren Denkens), originally published by Carl Hanser Verlag in 2011, which was an instant success, entering Germany's Der Spiegel Bestseller list as number 1. 
It was the bestselling non-fiction book in Germany and Switzerland in 2012. It was translated into English in 2013 by Nicky Griffin and hit the top ten bestseller lists in the U.K, South Korea, India, Ireland, Hong Kong and Singapore. In 2019 former Chief of Staff of the US Airforce Ronald Fogleman added the book to the top CSAF Required reading program. Dobelli presented his new book, "The Art of the Good Life", at an London School of Economics (LSE) Business Review event in October 2017.

In 2020 Dobelli published "Stop Reading the News, A Manifesto for a Happier, Calmer and Wiser Life". Martin Newman, reviewing the book for the Financial Review wrote, "'Stop Reading the News' explores the explosion of opinion-based news, the elevation of mediocrity over substance (The Kardashians!!), the way news creates the illusion of empathy, can elevate stress levels and builds a mindset that reinforces negativity".

Criticism 
In 2013, Nassim Nicholas Taleb published a piece on his website in which he accused Dobelli of plagiarism. This piece was published concurrently with a number of personal attacks launched by Taleb. This, and other personal attacks have led commentators to question Taleb's motives. Later, Christopher Chabris also published what he claimed to be an example in Dobelli's book that is referenced but does not have quotation marks. While Dobelli never claimed that the ideas were his, he has acknowledged their concerns and has updated subsequent editions. Claims of plagiarism have been disputed by Claudius Seidl, the cultural editor of the Frankfurter Allgemeine Zeitung.

In German 
Fünfunddreissig (Thirty-five), 2003
Und was machen Sie beruflich? (And What Do You Do for a Living?), 2004
Himmelreich (The Heavens), 2006
Wer bin ich? (Who Am I?), 2007
Turbulenzen (Turbulence), 2007
Massimo Marini, 2010
Die Kunst des klaren Denkens (The Art of Thinking Clearly), 2011
Die Kunst des klugen Handelns (The Art of Acting Clearly), 2012
Fragen an das Leben, 2014
Die Kunst des guten Lebens, 2017
Die Kunst des digitalen Lebens, 2019

In English 
The art of thinking clearly, 2013
The art of the good life, Sceptre, 2017
 Stop Reading the News, 2020

Memberships
Edge Foundation, Inc.,
PEN International
Royal Society of Arts

Literature
Rolf Dobelli, in the Munzinger-Archiv
Entry about Rolf Dobelli in the encyclopedia of the Association of Swiss Authors

References

External links
 (dobelli.com)

1966 births
Living people
People from Lucerne
Swiss male novelists
Swiss businesspeople
University of St. Gallen alumni
21st-century Swiss novelists
21st-century male writers